This was the first edition of the tournament.

Ann Li won her first WTA Tour title, defeating Camila Osorio in the final, 6–1, 6–4. Although this was Li's second final of her career, not counting Melbourne tournament earlier in the year which was cancelled due to lack of schedule.

Seeds

Draw

Finals

Top half

Bottom half

Qualifying

Seeds

Qualifiers

Lucky loser

Qualifying draw

First qualifier

Second qualifier

Third qualifier

Fourth qualifier

Fifth qualifier

Sixth qualifier

References

External links
Main draw
Qualifying draw

Tenerife Ladies Open - Singles